The I Am Music Tour, was a concert tour headlined by American rapper Lil Wayne. The tour was following his Grammy Award-winning album Tha Carter III.

The tour concluded with America's Most Wanted Tour featured Wayne's record label, Young Money Entertainment, and set a record for hip-hop acts with $42 million grossed.

Opening acts
Keri Hilson
Gym Class Heroes
Keyshia Cole
T-Pain
Porcelain Black

Tour dates

See also
Lil Wayne
Nicki Minaj

References

External links
Lil Wayne Announces his I Am Music Tour. Retrieved on 2009-5-18.
Lil Wayne extends 'I Am Music' tour. Retrieved on 2009-5-18
Saddledome, Calgary – January 22, 2009. Retrieved on 2009-05-18.

2008 concert tours
2009 concert tours
Lil Wayne